"Song to the Siren" is the first Chemical Brothers single released under the name The Dust Brothers. It was originally released under the "green label" for Diamond Records and was later released under the Junior Boys Own label. The song uses a sample of This Mortal Coil's version of Tim Buckley's "Song to the Siren" and a reversed voice sample from the Dead Can Dance's song "Song of Sophia" from their album The Serpent's Egg.

The Chemical Brothers, Tom Rowlands and Ed Simons, started to DJ in 1992 playing hip hop, techno, and house. Rowlands and Simons called themselves The Dust Brothers, after the US production duo famous for their work with the Beastie Boys. After a while, they began to run out of suitable instrumental hip hop tracks to use, so they started to make their own. Using a Hitachi hi-fi system, a computer, a sampler, and a keyboard, they recorded "Song to the Siren", which sampled This Mortal Coil's version. "Song to the Siren" was released on their own record label, called "Diamond Records" (after Ed's nickname). In October 1992, they pressed 500 white label copies and took them to various dance record shops around London, but none would play it, saying that it was too slow (the track played at 111 BPM). They sent a copy to London DJ Andrew Weatherall, who made it a permanent fixture in his DJ sets.

In May 1993, Junior Boy's Own released "Song to the Siren". The version featured on the single lasts four minutes and 49 seconds. Another version lasted four minutes and 30 seconds, which later appeared on Singles 93–03. The version featured on Exit Planet Dust is a live version, and is notably shorter at three minutes and 16 seconds. Though the 4:49 version has never been released on a Chemical Brothers CD, it appears on JBO: A Perspective 1988–1998, a compilation of material mostly from the Junior Boy's Own label.

Track listings

12" vinyl single (Diamond Records)
 "Song to the Siren"

12" vinyl single – JBO 10 
 "Song to the Siren (Full Sabre mix)"
 "Song to the Siren (Original Dust Brothers mix)"
 "Song to the Siren (Sabre 100% Chunk mix)"

References

1992 debut singles
The Chemical Brothers songs
1992 songs
Songs written by Tom Rowlands
Songs written by Ed Simons